Goffin is a surname, and may refer to:

 Albert Goffin (died 1958), Belgian banker, civil servant and governor of the National Bank of Belgium
 Andreas Leopold Goffin (1837-1863), Dutch naval officer and the eponym of Goffin's cockatoo
 Billy Goffin (1920–1987), English footballer
 David Goffin (born 1990), Belgian tennis player
 Dean Goffin (1916–1984), New Zealand musical composer
 Evi Goffin (born 1981), Belgian vocalist
 Gerry Goffin (1939–2014), American lyricist
 Louise Goffin (born 1963), singer, songwriter and musician
 Joel Goffin (born 1981), American film composer
 Peter Goffin (1906–1974), English set and costume designer and stage manager
 Robert Goffin (1898–1984), Belgian lawyer, author and poet, credited with writing the first "serious" book on jazz

See also
 1722 Goffin, an asteroid
 Coffin (surname)
 Tanimbar corella (Cacatua goffiniana) also known as Goffin's cockatoo

Surnames of Old English origin
Surnames of Belgian origin